David Sadler (13 February 1921 – 5 March 2014) was a British yacht designer who was responsible for a number of classic production yachts during the period from 1960 to 1980. His designs include the Contessa 26, the Contessa 32, the Sadler 25, the Sadler 29  and the Sadler 32. The Contessa 32 is his most successful design, with over 750 built.

References

1921 births
2014 deaths
British yacht designers